Branded is a 1920 British silent drama film directed by E. H. Calvert and starring Josephine Earle, Dallas Anderson and Nora Swinburne.

Cast
 Josephine Earle as Phyllis / Helen Jerningham  
 Dallas Anderson as Caton Brember 
 Nora Swinburne as Doris Jerningham  
 Francis Lister as Ralph Shopwyke  
 Maud Yates as Lady Margaret Maitland  
 Terence Cavanagh  as Sir Lionel Erskine  
 Morton Selten as Marquis of Shelford  
 Emilie Nichol as Mrs. Chichele

References

Bibliography
 Low, Rachael. The History of the British Film 1918-1929. George Allen & Unwin, 1971.

External links
 

1920 films
1920 drama films
British black-and-white films
British drama films
British silent feature films
Films directed by E. H. Calvert
Films set in England
Films based on British novels
1920s English-language films
1920s British films
Silent drama films